There are several Banganga Rivers in India.

Banganga River (Jammu and Kashmir), a river of northern India
Banganga River (Maharashtra), a small tributary of the Godavari River in the Nashik district
Banganga River (Rajasthan), originates from the Bairath hills in Jaipur

Rivers of India